Robert Greene may refer to:

Entertainment
Robert Greene (dramatist) (1558–1592), English writer
Bob Greene (fitness) (born 1958), American writer on fitness
Robert Greene (American author) (born 1959), American author of books on strategy
Robert Joseph Greene (born 1973), Canadian author of gay romance fiction
Robert Greene (filmmaker) (born 1976), American documentary filmmaker
Bob Greene (musician) (1922–2013), American jazz pianist

Journalism
Robert W. Greene (1929–2008), American journalist
Bob Greene (born 1947), American journalist and author
Robert Lane Greene, American journalist

Other
Robert Greene (philosopher) (1678–1730), English philosopher
Bob Greene (Makah) (1918–2010), American Makah elder
Robert Everist Greene (born 1943), American mathematician
Robert L. Greene, American psychologist
Bob Greene (politician), New Hampshire politician

See also
Bert Greene (disambiguation)
Bob Green (disambiguation)
 Greene (surname)
Robert Green (disambiguation)